Walter Price (1921-1984) was a footballer who played as a centre half in the Football League for Tranmere Rovers.

References

English footballers
Tranmere Rovers F.C. players
Rochdale A.F.C. players
Association football central defenders
English Football League players
1921 births
King's Lynn F.C. players
1984 deaths
People from Neston